Black Solidarity Day is a memorial day, created in 1969 by Panamanian-born activist, historian, playwright, Carlos E. Russell. It was inspired by the fictional play “Day of Absence” by Douglas Turner Ward. It is annually observed the day before Election Day in November, the first Monday of the month. Its purpose is for African diasporic people to exercise a 24- hour moratorium from shopping or participating in other commercial activity such as using the transit system. The Pan-African ideal of the observance is to highlight racial inequality and the gap between the wealthiest of one of the most powerful nations in the world and those living in poverty.

In the early years of its observance, Black Solidarity Day was a means of unifying many of the New York City Communities to show their economic power, with school closings and cultural events. It is still celebrated in pockets amongst African American and Caribbean neighborhoods. Part of its purpose is to show that the spending power of communities of color has an impact on the economy.

It is recognized and observed in higher education.

References 

November observances
Civil awareness days
Recurring events established in 1969